The Ariel W/NG 350 is a motorcycle based on the well-proven Ariel Red Hunter singles built by Ariel Motorcycles for the British military, and designed by the firm's chief designer Val Page in 1932 around an engine he had developed six years earlier.  Although the Ariel was not initially selected by the War Department, they were in great demand after the evacuation of Dunkirk when much of the British Army's materiel had been left behind.

Development
On the outbreak of the Second World War, Ariel submitted the 1939 VA  overhead valve single for evaluation against the War Office's Norton 16H. The  1939 W/VA 497cc side-valve single was also tested.  Both performed well and Ariel developed the W/NG specifically for military use. This was a  OHV single based on a Scottish six-day Trials winning model and went into production in 1940.

Although the French military immediately placed orders for the W/NG, the British War Office rated it as "fair – for use only in emergency purposes". Following the loss of equipment resulting from the evacuation of Dunkirk in May 1940 the "emergency purposes" became necessary, and Ariel turned over as many motorcycles as possible to the war effort, including converted civilian machines – many of which still carried an Ariel badge painted over with green or sand paint. VH & VG (500 OHV singles), NH & NG (350 OHV singles), and even the VB ( SV single) models were put into military service, although most were used for training and civil defence. The British Army, Royal Air Force, Admiralty, Ministry of Agriculture and Women's Land Army all used Ariel W/NG 350s.

Production
W/NG  motorcycles were supplied from 1940 to 1945 and featured dual triangular tool boxes, pannier frames for bags, rear carrying racks and headlamp masks.   Rubber items were impossible to source from 1942 because of a shortage of rubber, therefore handgrips were made from canvas and footrests from steel.  As the war progressed, aluminium also became scarce and pressed steel was used for the primary chaincase and timing covers.

Post war
After the war over 800 W/NG motorcycles were supplied to the Danish Army between 1946 and 1947. The remaining W/NGs that survived were mostly converted back into civilian specification for resale by dealers, so good examples of the military model are now rare.

In popular culture
An example attached to a sidecar appears in the film, Nanny McPhee and the Big Bang. The motorcycle, ridden by the title character, also appeared in versions of the advertising poster upon release.

See also
Matchless G3/L
List of motorcycles of the 1940s

References

External links
Background

W NG 350
Military motorcycles
Motorcycles introduced in the 1940s